Kunitake (written: 国威, 国武 or 邦武) is a masculine Japanese given name. Notable people with the name include:

, Japanese women's footballer
, Japanese businessman
, Japanese historian
, Japanese politician

Kunitake (written: 国武) is also a Japanese surname. Notable people with the surname include:

, Japanese snowboarder

Japanese-language surnames
Japanese masculine given names